Daulia auriplumbea is a moth in the family Crambidae. It was described by Warren in 1914. It is found in South Africa.

References

Endemic moths of South Africa
Moths described in 1914
Pyraustinae